Saint Patrick may refer to:

Saint Patrick, patron saint of Ireland
St Patrick (horse), a racehorse
Saint Patrick’s Day, a holiday celebrated on the saint’s feast day
 Saint Patrick, Bishop of Prusa, Hieromartyr (May 19)
Saint Patrick Parish, New Brunswick, Canada
Saint Patrick Parish, Dominica, an administrative parish
Saint Patrick Parish, Grenada, an administrative parish
St. Patrick, Ohio, United States, an unincorporated community
HMS Saint Patrick, a Royal Navy ship, in service 1666–1667
ST St Patrick, a tugboat
St. Patrick (provincial electoral district), a defunct district in Ontario, Canada
St. Patrick (TTC), a subway station in Toronto, Ontario, Canada
 "St. Patrick", a 2014 song from White Noise by PVRIS

See also
St. Patrick's (disambiguation)
St. Patrick's Cathedral (disambiguation)
St. Patrick's Church (disambiguation)
St. Patrick's College (disambiguation)
St. Patrick's School (disambiguation)
St. Patrick's High School (disambiguation)
San Patricio, Spanish for Saint Patrick